Rafael Alcázar  is a Spanish screenwriter, film director and producer.

Filmography
 No hagas planes con Marga (1988)
 Laberinto griego, El (1993)
 Corsarios del chip (1996)
 Besos de gato (2003)
 Locuras de Don Quijote, Las (2006)

References

External links

Spanish film directors
Spanish male screenwriters
Spanish male writers
Spanish film producers
Living people
Year of birth missing (living people)